is a 2012 Japanese anime television series. It was based on a 1980 unused script by Leiji Matsumoto. It was the final anime that Matsumoto had involvement with before his death in February 2023.

Plot
The story is set on Earth in the future when abnormal activity on the sun devastates Earth's atmosphere and covers the entire planet in a sea of sand. Sam pursues Ozma, an enemy of his brother. One day, Sam encounters Maya, who is being chased by the Theseus army.

Characters

Main characters

Sam Coin is the protagonist of OZMA. After his brother was taken, he joined the Baldanos' Crew. He often brings about trouble, for which the crew makes fun of him. He saved Maya, who was being pursued by the Theseus Army. Sam is very confident, and often does not think twice about taking risks. He is willing to do anything to assist someone in need.

Maya is a mysterious girl being chased by the Theseus Army. She is saved by Sam Coyne and brought aboard the Bardanos. She is one of the original "Ideal Children". The Ideal Children serve as the basis of the Theseus' cloning operation. Over time, the quality of the clones produced by the Theseus has dropped; the Theseus want to use Maya to counteract this degradation in quality.

Mimay is Sam Coin's childhood friend and a crew member of the Bardanos. She holds feelings for him, but he doesn't seem to notice.

Bainas is the captain of the Bardanos.

Episode list

References

External links
  
 OZMA on Crunchyroll
 

2012 anime television series debuts
Anime with original screenplays
Gonzo (company)
Leiji Matsumoto
Wowow original programming